James Northcote (born James Walker; 10 October 1987) is an English actor and producer who has appeared in The Last Kingdom (TV series),The Imitation Game, Nymphomaniac, Anna Karenina and Wuthering Heights.

Early life
Northcote, born in London, was brought up and went to school in the West Country - Kings College, Taunton. He went into drama at Queens' College, Cambridge, where he studied English. As a member of the National Youth Theatre, playing celebrity chef Alexis Soyer in their 2010 production of Relish, about the life of Soyer under the direction of Paul Roseby. At University he appeared with the Cambridge Footlights notably as the evil Nalu in the 2009 Pantomime Ali Baba and the Forty Thieves  and the Marlowe Society as Mercutio in a production of Romeo and Juliet. At the Edinburgh Fringe he played Toad in Wind in the Willows winning an Edinburgh NSDF Commendation- Emerging Artists Award.

Professional career
He made his professional debut as Edgar Linton in Wuthering Heights directed by Andrea Arnold.
His theatre work includes appearing in the Trevor Nunn production of Rosencratz and Guildenstern are Dead by Tom Stoppard and The Resistible rise of Arturo Ui by Bertolt Brecht at Chichester Festival. Recent stage roles are as Alan Bennett in The Lady in the Van at the Theatre Royal Bath, Caleb in the UK premier of The Whipping Man under the direction of Tom Attenborough at the Theatre Royal Plymouth  and as Mr Darcy in the Crucible Theatre Sheffield production of Pride and Prejudice, Millais in Lizzie Siddal at the Arcola  and Yolland in the highly successful production of Translations by Brian Friel with the English Touring Theatre. James appears in Lars von Trier controversial film Nymphomaniac and as Mr Vaughan in Belle. In 2018 he appeared at the Theatre Royal Bath as Alan Bennett in The Lady in the Van

Northcote appears the BBC Drama of SS-GB (miniseries) based on the book SS-GB by Len Deighton and in series 2 to 5 of The Last Kingdom (TV series), The Imitation Game as mathematician Jack Good, with Benedict Cumberbatch as Alan Turing and Keira Knightley as Joan Clarke. James will be appearing as the lead in a new French film The Open directed by Marc Lehore.  As a Producer he has completed a short film 'Morning is Broken', which was selected at British Film Institute Flare in 2015 and subsequently was used in the global Five Films 4 Freedom Campaign with the British Council.

Filmography

Film

Television

References

External links
 

1987 births
Alumni of Queens' College, Cambridge
21st-century English male actors
English male stage actors
English male television actors
English male film actors
Living people
Male actors from London
National Youth Theatre members
Place of birth missing (living people)